The 2021–22 Michigan Wolverines men's basketball team represented the University of Michigan during the 2021–22 NCAA Division I men's basketball season. This season marked the program's 106th season and its 105th consecutive year as a member of the Big Ten Conference. The Wolverines, led by third-year head coach Juwan Howard, played their home games for the 55th consecutive year at the Crisler Center in Ann Arbor, Michigan.

Previous season
The Wolverines finished the 2020–21 season 23–5, 14–3 in Big Ten play to its first Big Ten regular season championship since 2014. As the No. 1 seed in the Big Ten tournament, they defeated Maryland in the quarterfinals before losing to Ohio State in the semifinals. The Wolverines received an at-large bid to the NCAA tournament as the No. 1 seed in the East region, where they defeated Texas Southern and LSU to advance to their fourth straight Sweet Sixteen. In the Sweet Sixteen, they defeated Florida State before being upset by No. 11-seeded UCLA in the Elite Eight.

Offseason

Departures
Due to the COVID-19 pandemic, the NCAA granted an extra year of eligibility for all winter sport athletes. Despite this, seniors Rico Ozuna-Harrison, C. J. Baird, Luke Wilson and Austin Davis announced they would not return to Michigan. On April 7, 2021, Mike Smith declared for the 2021 NBA draft. On April 10, Chaundee Brown declared for the NBA draft with the intention of hiring an agent. On April 16, Isaiah Livers declared for the NBA draft. On May 4, Franz Wagner declared for the draft.

Incoming Transfers

Recruiting classes
On June 24, 2020, Michigan received its first class of 2021 commitment from four-star small forward Isaiah Barnes. On July 6, Michigan received its second commitment of the 2021 class, three-star forward Will Tschetter. On July 10, Michigan received its third commitment of the 2021 class, four-star shooting guard Kobe Bufkin. He was ranked No. 63 overall and No. 12 shooting guard. Bufkin became the first in-state prospect to commit to Michigan under head coach Juwan Howard. On August 19, Michigan received its fourth commitment of the 2021 class, four-star point guard Frankie Collins. He was ranked the nation's No. 57 prospect and No. 9 point guard. On October 30, Michigan received its fifth commitment of the 2021 class, five-star forward Caleb Houstan. He was ranked the No. 8 overall prospect in the nation, and No. 2 power forward, becoming Michigan's highest-rated recruit in the 247Sports era. On November 9, Michigan received its sixth commitment of the 2021 class, five-star power forward Moussa Diabaté. He was ranked the No. 20 overall prospect in the nation and No. 6 power forward. Michigan's recruiting class was the top-ranked class in the nation.

2021 recruiting class

2022 Recruiting class

Roster

Regular season

November
Michigan began the season on November 10 with an 88–76 victory over the Buffalo Bulls, winning their 19th consecutive season opener. Michigan was led by Hunter Dickinson with 27 points, his sixth career game with 20 or more points, while Terrance Williams II added a career-high 15 points and seven rebounds. On November 13, Michigan defeated Prairie View A&M 77–49. Michigan was led by Eli Brooks with 15 points, while Caleb Houstan added 13 points, and Dickinson added 11 points, including his first career three-pointer, and 10 rebounds, for his seventh career double-double. On November 16, Michigan was upset by Seton Hall 65–67 in the Gavitt Tipoff Games. Michigan was led by Dickinson with a game-high 18 points, and nine rebounds, while Brooks added 17 points, six rebounds and four assists, and DeVante' Jones recorded his 13th career double-double with 11 points and a team-high 12 rebounds. Williams drew a foul with 0.8 seconds remaining and had a chance to tie the game, however, he missed the first foul shot. On November 20, Michigan defeated UNLV 74–61 in the Roman Main Event semifinals. Michigan was led by Brooks with a game-high 22 points, his sixth career game with 20 or more points, while Moussa Diabaté added 14 points, seven rebounds, two blocks and a steal off the bench, and Dickinson added 13 points and seven rebounds. On November 21 Michigan lost to Arizona 62–80 in the Roman Main Event championship game. Michigan was led by Brooks with 14 points, while Dickinson added 11 points and a team-best seven rebounds. On November 24, Michigan defeated Tarleton State 65–54. Michigan was led by Brooks with 15 points, while Diabate added 14 points and seven rebounds, Houstan added 14 points and a career-high 10 rebounds for his first career double-double, and Dickinson added nine points, 10 rebounds, four blocks and three assists, one point shy of a double-double.

December
On December 1, Michigan lost to North Carolina 51–72 in the ACC–Big Ten Challenge. Michigan was led by Diabaté with 13 points in his first collegiate start, while Brooks added 11 points, six rebounds, three assists and two steals, and Houstan added eight points, and a team-high seven rebounds. On December 4, Michigan defeated San Diego State 72–58. Michigan was led by Dickinson with a game-high 23 points, 14 rebounds, three assists, three steals and a block for his eighth career double-double, while Houstan added a career-high 17 points, five rebounds, two steals and an assist, Brooks posted his eighth consecutive game in double figures with 10 points, and added four rebounds, five assists, three steals and a block, and Frankie Collins came off the bench and added a career-high eight points, four rebounds, three assists and a steal. On December 7, Michigan defeated Nebraska 102–67 in its Big Ten Conference season opener. Michigan was led by Williams with a career-high 22 points, while Johns tied a career-high with 20 points, Houstan added 16 points, Dickinson added 15 points and 12 rebounds for his ninth career double-double, and Brooks added 10 points. Michigan scored over 100 points for the first time since December 6, 2019. The Wolverines made 15 three-pointers, the most since November 17, 2018, when they also made 15 against George Washington. On December 11, Michigan lost to Minnesota 65–75. Michigan was led by Dickinson with 19 points and 10 rebounds, for his third consecutive double-double, while Jones added a season-high 14 points, Brooks added 12 points, his tenth consecutive game in double figures, and Diabate added seven points, 13 rebounds, three assists and two blocks. On December 18, Michigan defeated Southern Utah 87–50. Michigan was led by Dickinson with a game-high 22 points and 10 rebounds, for his fourth consecutive double-double, while Jones added 13 points, and a team-high six assists, and Kobe Bufkin added 11 points off the bench. On December 30, Michigan lost to UCF 71–85. Michigan was led by Brooks with 18 points, while Jones added 17 points, Diabate added 13 points, and Dickinson added 12 points and nine rebounds.

January
On January 4, Michigan lost to Rutgers 67–75. Michigan was led by Dickinson with 25 points, while Diabaté added 15 points and a team-high nine rebounds, Houstan added 12 points, and Brooks added 11 points. Michigan played without reserves Collins, Faulds, Johns and Williams II due to undisclosed medical reasons, while Jackson didn't make the trip due to personal reasons. This marked Rutgers first victory over Michigan in their 15-game series that began on December 20, 1933. After having two games postponed due to COVID-19 complications within the Michigan program, they returned to action on January 14 and lost to (No. 25 AP Poll/No. 24 Coaches Poll) Illinois 53–68. Michigan was without leading scorer Dickinson and Johns Jr. due to medical reasons. Michigan was led by Jones with a season high-tying 17 points, six rebounds and three steals. On January 18, Michigan defeated Maryland 83–64. Michigan was led by Dickinson with 21 points, a team-best six assists and a team-high tying six rebounds, while Houstan added 16 points, Diabaté added 14 points and Jones add 12 points. On January 23, Michigan defeated Indiana 80–62. Michigan was led by Dickinson with a game-high 25 points, and nine rebounds, finishing one rebound shy of a double-double, while Houstan added a career-high 19 points on a career-best five three pointers, Diabaté added 10 points, and Williams added 10 points off the bench. On January 26, Michigan defeated Northwestern 72–70. Michigan was led by Houstan with a game-high 18 points, his third consecutive game with 15 or more points, while Jones added 15 points and Brooks added 12 points. On January 29, Michigan lost their rivalry game against (No. 10 AP Poll/No. 10 Coaches Poll) Michigan State 67–83. Michigan was led by Dickinson with 25 points, six rebounds and a block, while Diabaté added 11 points and nine rebounds, one rebound shy of a double-double, and Houstan recorded his fourth consecutive double-figure scoring game with 11 points.

February
On February 1, Michigan defeated Nebraska 85–79. Michigan rallied from a seven-point half-time deficit, and scored the final six points of the game to secure the victory. Michigan was led by Dickinson with a game-high 26 points, with 20 points coming in the second half, while Brooks added 20 points, and Jones added 18 points, six rebounds and two assists. On February 5, Michigan lost to (No. 4 AP Poll/No. 3 Coaches Poll) Purdue 76–82. Michigan was led by Dickinson with a career-high tying 28 points, his sixth 20+ point game over his last seven games, while Jones added 13 points, four rebounds and four assists, and Houstan added 11 points and three assists. On February 8, Michigan defeated Penn State 58–57. Michigan closed the first half on an 11–0 run to tie the score 34–34 at half-time. Michigan was led by Dickinson with 19 points, and a career-high tying 15 rebounds for his sixth double-double, while Brooks added 16 points. On February 10, Michigan upset (No. 3 AP Poll/No. 3 Coaches Poll) Purdue 82–58. Michigan was led by Dickinson with a game high 22-points, while Brooks added 18 points, six rebounds and four assists, Diabaté added a career-high tying 15 points, Houstan added 14 points and Jones added 11 points, and a career-high tying 10 assists for his second double-double of the season. Brooks set the Michigan program record for career games played with 147. The win was Michigan's first over a ranked opponent this season, and the highest-ranked opponent Michigan has defeated under head coach Juwan Howard. On February 12, Michigan lost their rivalry game to (No. 16 AP Poll/No. 16 Coaches Poll) Ohio State 57–68. Michigan was led by Brooks with 17 points, while Dickinson added 14 points and seven rebounds, and Jones nearly recorded a triple-double with eight points, 10 rebounds and eight assists. Brooks became the 56th Wolverine in program history to record 1,000 career points. On February 17, Michigan defeated Iowa 84–79. Michigan was led by Diabaté with a career-high 28 points, while Dickinson added 14 points, nine rebounds, and a career-high seven assists, Brooks added 13 points, five assists and four rebounds, and Jones added 11 points and 10 rebounds, five assists and four steals, for his third double-double of the season. On February 20, Michigan lost to (No. 15 AP Poll/No. 16 Coaches Poll) Wisconsin 63–77. Michigan was led by Dickinson with 21 points, while Brooks added 14 points, and Houstan added six points and a career-high 10 rebounds. Following the loss at Wisconsin, tempers flared between Michigan head coach Juwan Howard and Wisconsin head coach Greg Gard in the handshake line. Howard struck a Wisconsin assistant coach in the face, sparking a brawl between Michigan and Wisconsin players. The following day, Big 10 commissioner Kevin Warren suspended Howard for the rest of the regular season and fined him $40,000 for his actions, while Gard was fined $10,000. Three players were also suspended one game for their actions, Diabate and Williams for Michigan, and Jahcobi Neath for Wisconsin. On February 23, Michigan defeated Rutgers 71–62. Michigan was led by Houstan with a career-high 21 points, while Dickinson added 16 points, 11 rebounds, three blocks and two assists for his seventh double-double, Jones added 14 points, seven rebounds and three assists, and Brooks added 11 points. On February 27, Michigan lost to (No. 15 AP Poll/No. 14 Coaches Poll) Illinois 85–93. Michigan was led by Jones with 25 points, and 10 assists for his 16th career double-double, while Houstan added a career-high tying 21 points, Dickinson added 13 points and 11 rebounds for his eighth double-double of the season, and Diabaté added 12 points.

March
On March 1, Michigan defeated Michigan State 87–70. Michigan was led by Dickinson with a career-high 33 points, nine rebounds, and a career-high tying four blocks, while Houstan added 16 points, and Williams recorded a career-high tying three three-pointers off the bench. On March 3, Michigan lost to (No. 24 AP Poll/No. 25 Coaches Poll) Iowa 71–82. Michigan was led by Dickinson with 21 points, 11 rebounds and four blocks for his tenth double-double of the season, while Brooks added 17 points, Houstan added 11 points and Jones added 10 points and a team-high six assists. On March 6, Michigan defeated (No. 23 AP Poll/No. 25 Coaches Poll) Ohio State 75–69. Michigan was led by Jones with 21 points, while Williams added 17 points off the bench, and Diabaté added seven rebounds and two assists.

Postseason

Big Ten tournament
On March 10, Michigan opened its 2022 Big Ten men's basketball tournament play with a 69–74 loss to Indiana in the second round. Michigan was led by Jones with 18 points, four rebounds, three assists and two steal, while Brooksadded  17 points, four steals, three assists and two rebounds in his 100th career start, and Dickinson added 15 points and five rebounds. Jones surpassed 1,600 career points and 600 rebounds for his collegiate career.

NCAA tournament
On March 13, Michigan received an at-large bid to the 2022 NCAA tournament as the No. 11 seed in the South Region. On March 17, Michigan begain their participation in the 2022 NCAA tournament with a 75–63 victory over (No. 24 AP Poll) Colorado State in the first round. Michigan was led by Dickinson with a game-high 21 points, six rebounds and four blocks, while Brooks added 16 points, Collins added a career-high 14 points, and Houstan added 13 points. Michigan rallied and overcame a 15-point deficit in the first half, as Colorado State recorded eight consecutive three-pointers on nine Michigan turnovers. Michigan was without starting point guard Jones due to concussion protocol.

On March 19, Michigan defeated (No. 5 AP Poll/No. 8 Coaches Poll) Tennessee 76–68 in the second round to upset the No. 3 seed in the South Region. Michigan was led by Dickinson with 27 points, including 3-of-5 on three-point field goals, 11 rebounds, four assists, a block and a steal, while Brooks added 23 points, and five assists and Diabaté added 13 points and six rebounds. Dickinson and Brooks outscored the entire Tennessee roster in the second half, 33–31. With the win, the Wolverines advanced to the Sweet Sixteen for the fifth consecutive year.

On March 24, Michigan lost to (No. 6 AP Poll/No. 5 Coaches Poll) Villanova 55–63 in the Sweet Sixteen. Michigan was led by Dickinson with 15 points, 15 rebounds, three assists and two blocks, for his second consecutive double-double of the tournament, while Brooks added 14 points, five rebounds, two assists and a steal. Michigan held Villanova to 9-of-30 on three-pointers, however, they struggled themselves, shooting just 21-of-61 from the field. After trailing by as many as nine points in the second half, Michigan reduced the lead to four points during the final 3:30 of the game. The Wolverines could not capitalize on three Villanova turnovers in the final 50 seconds of the game, as they made only one of their final 11 shots.

Schedule and results

|-
!colspan=12 style=| Exhibition
    
|-
!colspan=12 style=|Regular season

|-
!colspan=12 style=|  Big Ten tournament

|-
!colspan=9 style="background:#;"|NCAA tournament

Rankings

^Coaches did not release a Week 1 poll.*AP does not release post-NCAA tournament rankings.

Honors
Hunter Dickinson was a second team All-Big Ten honoree by both the coaches and the media. Moussa Diabate was a Big Ten All-Freshmen honoree by the coaches and Eli Brooks was an honorable mention All-Big Ten honoree.

Team players drafted into the NBA
Caleb Houstan was drafted 32nd overall in the second round of the 2022 NBA draft by the Orlando Magic. Moussa Diabaté was drafted 43rd overall in the 2022 NBA draft by the Los Angeles Clippers.

References

Michigan Wolverines men's basketball seasons
Michigan
Michigan
Michigan
Michigan